These are the major U.S. river basins in the U.S., as designated by the U.S. Water Resources Council.  Each of these river basins contain a number of smaller river basins.

Contiguous

1. Pacific Northwest Basin
2. California River Basin
3. Great Basin
4. Lower Colorado River Basin
5. Upper Colorado River Basin
6. Rio Grande River Basin
7. Texas Gulf Coast Basin
8. Arkansas-White-Red Basin
9. Lower Mississippi River Basin
10. Missouri River Basin
11. Souris-Red-Rainy Basin
12. Upper Mississippi Basin
13. Great Lakes Basin
14. Tennessee River Basin
15. Ohio River Basin
16. South Atlantic-Gulf Basin
17. Mid-Atlantic Basin
18. New England Basin

Alaska

 Copper River Basin
Yukon River Basin

Hawaii

See also
Drainage basin
Hydrology

References

External links
USGS National Water Census

Lists of drainage basins
River basins